The Esterházy of Galanta castle is a renaissance castle. It is one of the most important historical buildings of Galanta, Slovakia. Originally, the residency of the Esterházy family, a branch called the Esterházy "of Galanta". it was built and inhabited by the Esterházy of Galanta family since around 1630, when it was built. It is still in renovation nowadays, and hopefully, will one day serve as a part of the regional museum in Slovakia. Its ground floor is a restaurant and serves as a place for holding wedding ceremonies and for bigger representational activities, the basement is a hip bar, and hosts cultural and social activities, and the first floor will in the near future serve as a gallery and for museum purposes.

History
The Castle was built in 1860 by the Esterházy of Galanta family on previous basements. Its architecture is from the Tudorian England's Romantic Gothic Era and it was set in a park. It belonged since then to the Esterházy of Galanta family, which was from around onward 1600 one of the most powerful aristocratic families, in all of Europe until around 1930. Its original two-wing disposition is with small changes still present. Attached to the main entrance of the castle was a small tower, which was slightly higher than the main part, and it was decorated with a renaissance-style attic, which covered its low roof. The building had richly and colorfully decorated façades with large symmetric windows. All renaissance castles were also called manors.

References

Literature

Monuments and memorials in Slovakia
Buildings and structures in Trnava Region
Castles in Slovakia
Museums in Trnava Region
History museums in Slovakia
Tourist attractions in Trnava Region
Esterházy family